Other Voices is an international music TV Series, festival, and tourism event in its own right that celebrates the local on a global scale. 

For the past 20 years, Other Voices has brought musicians and artists from across the world to Dingle, West Kerry, to raise their voices to sing. Since the very first intimate gathering in 2001 to the current three-day festival of music, song and storytelling across more than 20 venues, Other Voices is now an established fixture in the Irish and international music calendar; a ‘must attend’ event for performers and audiences alike. Over the past 20 years Other Voices has travelled from its home base in West Kerry to Austin, London, Belfast, Ballina, New York, Derry, Cardigan Wales and Berlin, enriching the cultural life of every destination it visits. 

Other Voices broadcasts on Irish public service broadcaster RTÉ and is available to view on demand worldwide on the RTÉ player.

Past performers at Other Voices include: Hozier, Amy Winehouse, Ellie Goulding, Mumford & Sons, St. Vincent, The xx, The National, Little Simz, Sigrid, Willie Nelson, Conor Oberst, Florence + The Machine, Gregory Porter, Jessie Ware, Sinead O’Connor, Laura Marling, Arlo Parks, Sam Fender, Christy Moore, Super Furry Animals, Jarvis Cocker, Laura Mvula, Snow Patrol, Villagers, Fontaines D.C., Lisa Hannigan, The Gloaming, Lankum, Gilla Band, Rufus Wainwright & Dermot Kennedy.

The filming for Other Voices TV series takes place annually in St. James’ Church, Dingle which holds 80 guests who witness exceptional music in a small, intimate setting. Tickets are given away through competitions and cannot be purchased. Performances are streamed into venues around Dingle town including Benners Hotel, Paul Geaney's Bar, Marina Inn Dingle, John Bennys Pub, Nellie Fred's, McCarthys Bar, Barr na Sráide, O'Sullivans, Courthouse Pub, Foxy John's, Neligan's Bar, The Dingle Pub.

The show (previously called Other Voices: Songs from a Room) first aired in 2003. It is currently Ireland's leading live music series which focuses mainly on alternative music from Irish and international artists. Each December over three days a season is filmed in Dingle, County Kerry, Ireland during the Other Voices Music Festival. Since the very first intimate gathering in 2001 Other Voices has held satellite events across the world in New York, Berlin, Austin and Wales, and has become an established fixture in the Irish and international music calendar. In 2020, in response to the global pandemic, Other Voices launched its 'Courage' live stream series which featured performances from artists including Lisa Hannigan, Glen Hansard and James Vincent McMorrow. In December 2020, for the first time Other Voices held its annual Dingle edition as a five-day digital festival called 'Bringing It All Back Home', which showcased Irish and international acts including Hozier, Damien Dempsey, Pillow Queens. In December, 'Other Voices: Home at the Guinness Storehouse' took place in Dublin City and included performances from Villagers, Denise Chaila and The Mary Wallopers.

Format
Each episode features live musical performances from both Irish and international artists. It also features in-studio or on-scene interviews from various locations across Dingle town. Filming of the live performances is usually in the intimate setting of the 200-year-old Church of St James in Dingle, County Kerry. The programme has had a range of presenters since the first series began in 2001, including Glen Hansard (season 1), Jerry Fish (season 2), John Kelly (seasons 3–7), Jenny Huston (season 6, alongside Kelly), Annie Mac (seasons 7–8, 14-present), Aidan Gillen (seasons 10–13) and Huw Stephens (seasons 13-present). In 2020 MayKay (Fight Like Apes) presented 'Bringing It All Back Home' while Loah presented 'Other Voices: Home at the Guinness Storehouse'.

History

Shilpa Ganatra, writing in the Irish Independent in 2008, said: "Explaining Other Voices to a foreigner would sound like a flu-induced dream. I was in a pub in this tiny fishing village in the west of Ireland, where Ryan Adams was being filmed playing in front of 80 people in a tiny church. He was in the pub afterwards, and so was Paul Noonan from Bell X1 and Sinéad O'Connor, and Fight Like Apes were telling us about the most sordid website in existence".

The series was originally titled Other Voices: Songs From a Room; however, this was shortened as the series progressed. The sixth series was recorded in November and December 2007, and began broadcasting on 13 February 2008. It brought about a slight change of format, with the introduction of a second host in Jenny Huston and acoustic performances being filmed outside the Church of St James, in various places around Dingle.

The seventh series was recorded in Saint James's Church in Dingle from 5–9 December 2008 and aired in January 2009. It was presented by John Kelly and Annie Mac. Emilíana Torrini and Duke Special performed on the Friday, whilst Billy Bragg, Liam Finn and Colm Mac Con Iomaire performed on the Saturday. The Sunday line-up consisted of Elbow, Richard Hawley and James Morrison, whilst the Monday line-up consisted of Lisa Hannigan, Steve Reynolds and Mick Flannery. Kíla, Imelda May, Eric Bibb and Jape performed on the final night.

The eighth series was recorded in Saint James's Church in Dingle from 5–9 December 2009. It was presented by Annie Mac. Snow Patrol, Richard Hawley, The xx, The Temper Trap, The Magic Numbers, Imelda May, Brett Anderson and Speech Debelle are amongst the performers. A three-song acoustic performance by Florence and the Machine was recorded for the show in a separate venue due to the artist having other tour commitments. A performance by Snow Patrol involved the first ever use of optical burst switching for a live performance. The series was broadcast on RTÉ Two from 3 February until 10 March 2010.

Other Voices NYC, broadcast over Christmas 2011, centres on East Village, New York City, featuring Gabriel Byrne, Glen Hansard, Roddy Doyle, Damien Rice and Joseph O'Connor amongst others.

Supporters
The series is supported by RTÉ Television, IMRO, Department of Arts, Heritage and the Gaeltacht/An Roinn Ealaíon, Oidhreachta agus Gaeltachta and the 2016 season is also supported by The Ireland Funds, Lonely Planet and the Wild Atlantic Way. The 2015 season was supported by The Guardian.

Albums
The success of the television series has led to the release of a number of CDs featuring live recordings from the series. In more recent years, Other Voices live content has been made available to stream on Spotify and to purchase on Apple Music. The move to music streaming and download services came as the CD series was discontinued.

Track listings
CD1
 Release: 22 May 2003 (Republic of Ireland)
 Label: Dara Records

 American Townland – Interference
 Snow Is Gone – Josh Ritter
 Healthy – Mundy
 Universal – Nina Hynes
 Closer To Happy – Emmett Tinley
 True Friends – Jerry Fish
 Other Men – Martin Finke
 Volunteer – Mark Geary
 Belle – Paul Tiernan
 Stars Above – Maria Doyle Kennedy
 On A May Morning – Barry McCormack
 Party On – Damien Dempsey
 Star Star – The Frames
 The Blower's Daughter – Damien Rice
 Anyone Who's Yet To Come – Paddy Casey
 What Would I know – Roesy
 Standing in Doorways – Ger Wolfe
 An Taobh Tuathail Amach – Rónán Ó Snodaigh
 Limerick – John Hegarty

CD2
 Release:
 Label: Dara Records

 Staring at the Sun – Simple Kid
 Evening Sun- Gemma Hayes
 Self Servin' Society – Paddy Casey
 Heyday – Glen Hansard
 Captain Cassanova – Rodrigo Y Gabriella
 One Man Guy – Turn
 Erin The Green – Cara Dillon
 Daybreak – Bell X1
 Metropolitan Avenue – Christy Moore
 Quiet of the night – Karan Casey
 Saturdays – David Kitt
 The Be All and End All – Bic Runga
 Forgotten Lake – The Handsome Family
 You- Luka Bloom
 Out of the Blue – The Tyco Brahe
 Your World – Declan O'Rourke
 My Brass Buttons – The Jimmy Cake
 Churchyard – Pauline Scanlon
 Upside Down- Jerry Fish & The Mudbug Club

CD3
 Release: 03.06.2005 (Republic of Ireland)
 Label: Dara Records
 A Drop of Rain – Joe Chester
 Hold Up – Republic of Loose
 Sunnyroad – Emiliana Torrini
 It's Been Done – Angela McCloskey
 GoGo (Don't Go) – The Chalets
 Galileo – Declan O'Rourke
 Saints and Sinners- Paddy Casey
 Sunshine Superman – Donovan
 Kite Flyers Hill – Eddi Reader
 Day in Verona – Tom Baxter
 Our Mutual Friend – The Divine Comedy
 Misguided Angel – Cowboy Junkies
 Ellis Unit One- Steve Earle
 Back to Me – Kathleen Edwards
 Angel- Gavin Friday
 Liberty Bell – Autamata
 Hungry – Sonny Condell
 Wedding Dress – Mark Lanegan Band

Logos

References

External links
 Official site
 Official Production website
 Six One News 2 December 2011: Other Voices celebrated in Dingle

2000s in Irish music
2010s in Irish music
Dingle
Irish music television shows
RTÉ original programming